Helicopter Training School (HTS) is an institution of Indian Air Force located at Hyderabad. It was established at Air Force Station Palam on 2 April 1962. It is one of the largest helicopter units of IAF.

Training 
Apart from training helicopter pilots for the Air Force, the Helicopter Training School also trains pilots of the Army, Navy, Coast Guard and other friendly countries.

The Helicopter Training School located in Air Force Station Hakimpet has about 40 types of helicopters, and on an average, 15 to 20 helicopters fly everyday as part of training to officers.

Participation in relief work 
HTS participated in relief works during floods in Andhra Pradesh and Karnataka and air-dropped food and other essential supplies.

See also
 Indian National Defence University
 Military Academies in India
 Sainik school

References 

Indian Air Force